Fang Xin may refer to:

Fang Xin (politician)
Fang Xin (ice hockey)
Fon Cin, Taiwanese actress